HARMONY Network NZ (acronym for Happiness, Autonomy, Resilience, Motivation, Opportunity, Nature and Young) is an unregistered political party in New Zealand. According to a press release from the party, it is environmentalist and supports happiness and autonomy.

The party contested one electorate in the 2020 New Zealand general election; Sophia Xiao-Colley, in Northland She received 28 votes, coming last out of twelve candidates.

References

Political parties in New Zealand
Political parties established in 2020
2020 establishments in New Zealand